SeaDream Yacht Club is a private cruise line with its headquarters in Oslo, Norway.  It was founded in 2001 by Atle Brynestad, the Norwegian founder of Seabourn Cruise Line.

Market position
According to USA Today, "SeaDream Yacht Club delivers a luxurious, yet low-key experience that's appealing even to those who don't usually cruise."  SeaDream's slogan is "it's yachting, not cruising".  The company's passengers are likely to be SeaDream repeaters, and to feel like members of a club: "It's a well-traveled, cultured, convivial bunch, mostly Americans and Europeans and mostly couples, age 40 and up."

, SeaDream's destinations included the Mediterranean, Caribbean, northern Europe and Asia-Pacific.

Fleet
SeaDream runs a fleet of two small cruise ships, formerly operated by Sea Goddess Cruises:

The two ships have been said to offer "... clubby scale, [and a] sense of privacy and exclusivity ...", but with lodgings not as luxurious as those of Seabourn or Silversea vessels.  Each is equipped with a watersports marina that can be lowered for activities such as swimming, snorkelling, kayaking, windsurfing, and waterskiing.  Both ships are stocked with complimentary equipment for waterborne activities, including wave runners, glass-bottom kayaks, Laser sailboats, a banana boat, water skis, snorkeling gear and standup paddleboards. Also available are mountain bikes for use ashore.

Future ships 
On March 20, 2019, the company announced the purchase of a new 220-passenger ship, SeaDream Innovation, from Damen Shipyards. It was planned to start sailing in September 2021. It was cancelled the same year

See also

Cruising (maritime)
List of cruise lines

External links

SeaDream Yacht Club – official site
SeaDream Yacht Club UK – official UK site
"SeaDream I" – review by Douglas Ward in The Daily Telegraph, London, of the SeaDream I.
"SeaDream II" – review by Teresa Machan in The Daily Telegraph, London, of the SeaDream II voyage in Greek Islands.
"When only the best will do" – review by David S. Potts in The Sydney Morning Herald of a cruise on the SeaDream II.

References

Cruise lines
Transport companies established in 2001
Shipping companies of Norway
Companies based in Oslo
2001 establishments in Norway